Mohammad Ajmal Qadri (popularly known as Ajmal) (17 May 1910 – 19 June 1988) was best known for his role as Kaido in classic Pakistani Punjabi film Heer Ranjha (1970 film). 

This film had super-hit music by music director Khwaja Khurshid Anwar and film song lyrics by Ahmad Rahi. He played the same role in the previously made film Heer (1955 film) in Pakistan which was directed by the veteran film director Nazir Ahmed Khan.

Early life and career
Ajmal was mostly seen in supporting roles in Pakistani movies. His movies tally is 212  (77 Urdu films and 135 Punjabi films). His first film in Pakistan was Hichkolay (1949). Ajmal (real name Mohammad Ajmal Qadri) was born on 17 May 1910 and died on 19 June 1988 in Lahore. He was the elder brother of Punjabi films lead actor Akmal.

Selected filmography
Ajmal was introduced in pre-1947 Lahore-made Punjabi film Sohni Mahiwal in 1937.

He started as a villain actor and appeared in many movies like: 
Yamla Jat (1940)
 Khazanchi (1941 film)
 Khandan (1942 film)
 Zamindar (1942)
 Hichkolay (1949) his debut film in Pakistan
 Heer (1955 film)
 Guddi Guddi (1956)
 Baghi (1956)
 Yakke Wali (1957)
 Ishq-e-Laila (1957)
Nooran (1957)
 Jatti (1958)
 Kartar Singh (1959)
 Sohni Kumharan (1960)
 Tees Mar Khan (1963)
 Malangi (1965)
 Phannay Khan (1965)
 Imam Din Gohavia (1967)
 Heer Ranjha (1970)
 Khan Chacha (1972)
Athra Puttar (1981)
 Moti Tay Dogar (1983)
 Babul (1990)

Awards
 Special Nigar Award for film Heer Ranjha (1970 film)

See also
 Akmal Khan (his younger brother)

References

External links
Filmography of Ajmal on IMDb website

1910 births
1988 deaths
20th-century Pakistani male actors
Muhajir people
Pakistani male film actors
Male actors in Punjabi cinema
Nigar Award winners